The Seven Society, Order of the Crown & Dagger (colloquially known as the Seven '7' Society or Sevens '7s') is the longest continually active secret society of the College of William & Mary in Williamsburg, Virginia.  The clandestine, yet altruistic group is said to consist of seven senior individuals, selected in their junior year.  While, historically, graduating members formally announced their identities each spring, today's membership is steeped in mystery and is only revealed upon a member's death.

Now rumored to meet late at night in Colonial Williamsburg's Shields Tavern, present-day Sevens make efforts to honor and encourage those who help strengthen the university. Through its endowment association, the society pursues major philanthropic projects such as scholarships and anonymous donations to the College.  Sevens have also been known to mysteriously leave small gifts and tokens of appreciation for unsuspecting groups and individuals (e.g., in 2003, an admissions counselor discovered two dozen golf umbrellas – each adorned with the '7' symbol – after casually mentioning how helpful they'd be during rainy campus tours).

History
The Seven Society is most commonly believed to have been founded in 1826.  Little else is known about the society's early history; for the College of William & Mary, the second half of the 19th century brought the American Civil War, two devastating campus fires, and the College's subsequent closing from 1881 to 1888.  But by the beginning of the 20th century, the Sevens had resurfaced; and in 1939 the group publicly declared themselves to be “the only secret society of the College of William and Mary" (other recorded groups – namely The 13s, Alphas, and Flat Hats – were highly selective student clubs that would later be revived as secret societies).

Motifs and symbols
In chartering the College of William & Mary, founding benefactors King William III and Queen Mary II of England sought to establish "a certain place of universal study" to be led by "one President, six Masters or Professors."  Together these seven individuals would be known simply as the Society.  In 1729, after the full installation of the College’s "departments" (a president and six professors), corporate authority of William & Mary was transferred from the College’s surviving trustees to the seven-member Society.  The group served as the governing body for the university – ensuring William & Mary’s continuous wellbeing and future prosperity.
A seven motif appears elsewhere on the campus.  The Royal Charter instructs chancellors to serve seven year terms.  The Sunken Gardens area is crossed with seven brick pathways.  Seven buildings surround the gardens- Washington Hall, Ewell Hall, McGlothin Street Hall, the Christopher Wren building, John Tyler Hall, Tucker Hall, and James Blair Hall.  Of the lodge buildings, housing in the middle of campus traditionally held by seniors (until they were knocked down in 2016 for the construction of the Integrated Wellness Center), seven were used for housing.

Tyler and The Seven Wise Men

The most legendary Society was established and led by the College’s 17th president, Lyon Gardiner Tyler.  Still suffering from the effects of the Civil War, William & Mary was ultimately forced to close its doors in 1881.  After being closed for seven years, the school was reopened in 1888 by the then newly appointed president, Lyon G. Tyler.  By 1891, President Tyler had managed to assemble a "small but able" teaching staff that included professors Hugh S. Bird, Charles E. Bishop, Van F. Garrett, J. Lesslie Hall, Thomas J. Stubbs, and Lyman B. Wharton.  Affectionately dubbed the "Seven Wise Men" by students, Tyler and the six professors are credited not only with reviving William & Mary but also for transforming the College into a thriving, modern-day university. The statue of Lyon G. Tyler on William and Mary's campus was found mysteriously rapidly oxidized in early 2022.

Notable 20th-century members
 Lawrence W. l’Anson – Chief Justice, Virginia Supreme Court (1974–1981)
 Roy R. Charles – noted philanthropist; endowed the W&M Charles Center for Honors & Interdisciplinary Studies
 H. Westcott "Scotty" Cunningham – first president of Christopher Newport University
 Arthur "Art" Matsu – W&M's first Asian-American student (Class of 1928); first alumnus to play professional football
 Earl Gregg Swem, Jr. – son of renowned W&M librarian, Earl Gregg Swem, Sr.
 Walter J. Zable – leading global businessman, philanthropist; namesake of W&M's Zable Stadium

See also
I Am the College of William and Mary (1945 poem)
Secret societies at the College of William & Mary
Collegiate secret societies in North America

External links 
 Lyon G. Tyler Department of History

References

College of William & Mary student life
Collegiate secret societies
Student societies in the United States
1826 establishments in Virginia
Student organizations established in 1826